Daiyu may refer to:
 Lin Daiyu, a character from the Chinese novel Dream of the Red Chamber
 Wang Daiyu, an Arab-Chinese scholar
 Daiyu Tatsumi, a former sumo wrestler
 Aunt Daiyu, a fictional character in the animated series Stitch & Ai
 Daiyu (Star Wars), a fictional planet in the Star Wars miniseries Obi-Wan Kenobi